Villa Pesqueira Municipality is a town, and the surrounding municipality of the same name, in the central region of the Mexican state of Sonora.

Municipal seat
It was founded in 1629 by the missionary Martín de Azpilcueta as (San José de) Mátapa. The State Congress ordered the change to its current name, at the inhabitants' request, on 11 February 1867.

Creation
The municipality was created on 11 December 1930, with the division of its territory from the adjacent municipality of Ures Municipality.

Area
The municipal area is 1,834.13 km2.

Population
The population was 1,590, of whom 96% lived in the urban area.

Economy
The main economic activities are cattle raising (18,000 head in 2005), subsistence farming, and mining.

External links
Villa Pesqueira, Sonora (Enciclopedia de los Municipios de México)

Municipalities of Sonora